Passerivirus is a genus of viruses in the order Picornavirales, in the family Picornaviridae. Birds serve as natural hosts. There are currently only two species in this genus: the type species Passerivirus A and a second, novel passerivirus that was discovered in 2018 in a population of Hungarian home-reared finches, where it achieved an over 50 percent mortality rate.

Taxonomy
Group: ssRNA(+)

Structure
Viruses in Passerivirus are non-enveloped, with icosahedral and  Spherical geometries, and T=pseudo3 symmetry. The diameter is around 30 nm. Genomes are linear and non-segmented, around 8kb in length.

Life cycle
Viral replication is cytoplasmic. Entry into the host cell is achieved by attachment of the virus to host receptors, which mediates endocytosis. Replication follows the positive stranded RNA virus replication model. Positive stranded RNA virus transcription is the method of transcription. The virus exits the host cell by lysis, and  viroporins.
Birds serve as the natural host.

References

External links
 Viralzone: Passerivirus
 ICTV

Picornaviridae
Bird diseases
Virus genera